Susan Tighe is a professor of Civil engineering and the Provost of McMaster University. Appointed to that position in 2020, she had previously been the deputy Provost at the University of Waterloo. She is a fellow of the Canadian Academy of Engineering and the Canadian Society of Civil Engineers. She held the Norman W. McLeod Endowed Chair in Sustainable Pavement Engineering from 2000 until she left the University of Waterloo to join the McMaster University. In 2014, she was amongst the inaugural cohort of inductees to the College of New Scholars, Artists and Scientists of the Royal Society of Canada.

See also
 List of University of Waterloo people

References 

Canadian women engineers
Canadian engineers
Academic staff of McMaster University
Living people
Year of birth missing (living people)